Miss Rwanda 2009, the 2nd edition of the Miss Rwanda pageant, was held on December 19, 2009 at Gikondo Expo Grounds in Kigali.

The winner, Grace Bahati succeeded Dalila Uwera, Miss Rwanda 1993.

Results

Special Awards 
Miss Congeniality - Winnie Uwanyuze (Eastern Province)
Miss Photogenic - Grace Bahati (Southern Province)
Miss Popular - Winnie Ngamije (Kigali)

Preparation
The 13 contestants were selected from their respective provinces to compete in the national competition. Various activities were organized to prepare candidates for the final. The first training camp was held at Lake Kivu Serena Hotel in Rubavu and later, in Nyarutarama. The training was based on the culture, economy and history of Rwanda.

Contestants

Judges 
The Miss Rwanda 2009 final judges were:

Sonia Rolland Uwitonze - Actress and director. Miss Burgundy 1999 and Miss France 2000.
Kat Cole - Businesswoman, Group President of Focus Brands and Chief Operations Officer of Cinnabon
Kije Mugisha-Rwamasirabo - Director of Rwanda Television from 2008 to 2011.
Christine Tuyisenge - Executive Secretary of the National Women Council (NWC)
Manzi Kayihura - Director general of Rwandair Express.

Crossovers 
Contestants who previously competed or will be competing at international beauty pageants:

Miss FESPAM
2007: Southern Province: Carine Utamuliza Rusaro (1st Runner-up)

Miss Tourism Queen International 
2008: Southern Province: Carine Utamuliza Rusaro (Top 10)

Miss Naiades
2011: Southern Province: Carine Utamuliza Rusaro (Winner)

Miss East Africa 
2011: Kigali: Fiona Ruboneka
's representative

Miss Tourism of the Millennium
2012: Southern Province: Carine Utamuliza Rusaro

References

External links
Official website

2009
2009 in Rwanda
2009 beauty pageants